Ángel Pedraza Lamilla (4 October 1962 – 8 January 2011) was a Spanish professional footballer who played as a full back and a central midfielder.

Playing career
Born in La Rinconada, Seville, Andalusia, Pedraza joined FC Barcelona's youth ranks, and spent two seasons with the reserves in Segunda División. On 16 September 1980, László Kubala granted him the opportunity to play in one UEFA Cup match against Sliema Wanderers F.C. in Malta, and he became the first La Masia player ever to appear for the main squad.

In January 1986, with Terry Venables as a coach, Pedraza made his La Liga debut with the first team, with which he would play a further three years, being mostly used as a backup. In the 1986 European Cup Final he was one of four Barça players – the others were José Ramón Alexanko, Pichi Alonso and Marcos – to have their penalty shootout attempts saved by FC Steaua București goalkeeper Helmuth Duckadam, as the Catalans lost the decisive match in Seville (0–0 after 120 minutes).

Pedraza signed with RCD Mallorca in the 1988 off-season, with the Balearic Islands club being coached by a young Lorenzo Serra Ferrer, who relocated the player from central midfielder to full back. In his first season he was an essential defensive unit (3,241 minutes, one goal) as they returned to La Liga, and also reached the Copa del Rey final in 1991; during six of his seven years with the team he did not appear in less than 30 league games, and retired from football in 1997 at the age of 35 after a two-year stint with amateurs CF Sóller, also in Majorca.

Coaching career
Immediately after retiring Pedraza started managing, spending five years with several youth sides at former club Barcelona. In 2002, he moved across the city and coached RCD Espanyol's juniors, joining the B team afterwards.

Pedraza then spent three seasons in Segunda División B, first with Benidorm CF then Villarreal CF B. After one year in Greece, split between two teams, he returned to his country and took charge of amateurs CD Atlético Baleares, helping them promote from Tercera División as champions.

In July 2010, despite being already suffering from cancer, Pedraza agreed to take over at CE L'Hospitalet in the third level. He was however removed from his managerial duties after only three months. On 8 January 2011, aged only 48, he succumbed to the illness in Barcelona.

Personal life
Pedraza's son, Marc, was also a professional footballer. A midfielder, he was brought up in Espanyol's youth system, being coached by his father at Hospitalet, with the manager being sacked precisely after the player's debut.

Honours

Player
Barcelona
Copa del Rey: 1987–88
Copa de la Liga: 1986
European Cup runner-up: 1985–86

Mallorca
Copa del Rey runner-up: 1990–91

Manager
Atlético Baleares
Tercera División: 2009–10

References

External links

1962 births
2011 deaths
People from La Rinconada
Sportspeople from the Province of Seville
Spanish footballers
Footballers from Andalusia
Association football defenders
Association football midfielders
Association football utility players
La Liga players
Segunda División players
Tercera División players
FC Barcelona Atlètic players
Villarreal CF players
FC Barcelona players
RCD Mallorca players
Spain youth international footballers
Spanish football managers
Segunda División B managers
RCD Espanyol B managers
Villarreal CF B managers
CD Atlético Baleares managers
CE L'Hospitalet managers
Super League Greece managers
Iraklis Thessaloniki F.C. managers
Panserraikos F.C. managers
Spanish expatriate football managers
Expatriate football managers in Greece
Spanish expatriate sportspeople in Greece
Deaths from cancer in Spain